The Dhalai River (also known as Dhala River) a trans-boundary river in India and Bangladesh. It rises in the mountains of the Indian state of Tripura. It enters Kulaura Upazila of Maulvibazar District of Bangladesh. Later it joins Manu River in Rajnagar Upazila. The co-ordinates of Dhalai River at Ambassa are 23.55'128'' N and 91.51'204'' E in degrees minutesseconds(DMS). Some of the popular riverside townships of Dhalai River are the towns of Ambassa, Baralutma and Kamalpur.

Gallery

See also

 List of rivers of India
 List of rivers in Bangladesh

References

Rivers of Bangladesh
Rivers of Tripura
Rajnagar Upazila
Kulaura Upazila
Rivers of India
Rivers of Sylhet Division
Bangladesh–India border
International rivers of Asia
Border rivers